Olympia F.C. may refer to:

 Olympia FC Warriors, an Australian soccer team  based in Hobart which plays in the National Premier Leagues Tasmania
 Olympia F.C. (Dublin), a former League of Ireland team 
 Olympia F.C., an American soccer team that entered the National Challenge Cup during the 1920s

See also
 Olympia București a football club based in Bucharest, Romania
 Olympic FC (disambiguation)